Emotional Rescue is the 15th British and 17th American studio album by English rock band the Rolling Stones, released on 20 June 1980 by Rolling Stones Records. Following the success of their previous album, Some Girls, their biggest hit to date, the Rolling Stones returned to the studio in early 1979 to start writing and recording its follow-up. Full-time members Mick Jagger (vocals), Keith Richards (guitar), Ronnie Wood (guitar), Bill Wyman (bass) and Charlie Watts (drums) were joined by frequent collaborators Ian Stewart (keyboards), Nicky Hopkins (keyboards), Bobby Keys (saxophone) and Sugar Blue (harmonica).

Upon release, the album topped the charts in at least six countries, including the United States, UK, and Canada. Hit singles from it include the title track, which reached No. 1 in Canada, No. 3 in the United States, and No. 9 in the UK and "She's So Cold," a top-40 single in several countries. The recording sessions for Emotional Rescue were so productive that several tracks left off the album would form the core of the follow-up, 1981's Tattoo You.

History
Recorded throughout 1979, first in Compass Point Studios, Nassau, Bahamas, then Pathé Marconi, Paris, with some end-of-year overdubbing in New York City at The Hit Factory, Emotional Rescue was the first Rolling Stones album recorded following Keith Richards' exoneration from a Toronto drugs charge that could have landed him in jail for years. Fresh from the revitalization of Some Girls (1978), Richards and Mick Jagger led the Stones through dozens of new songs, some of which were held over for Tattoo You (1981), and picked ten for Emotional Rescue.

Several of the tracks on the album featured just the core Rolling Stones band members: Jagger, Richards, Ronnie Wood, Charlie Watts, and Bill Wyman. On others, they were joined by keyboardists Nicky Hopkins and co-founder Ian Stewart, sax player Bobby Keys and harmonica player Sugar Blue.

Songs left off the album appeared on Tattoo You ("Hang Fire", "Little T&A" and "No Use in Crying"). "Think I'm Going Mad," another song from the sessions, was released as the B-side to "She Was Hot" in 1984. A cover song sung by Richards, "We Had It All," was released on the 2011 deluxe Some Girls package.

Packaging and artwork
The album cover for Emotional Rescue had concept origination, art direction and design by Peter Corriston with thermographic photos taken by British-born, Paris-based artist Roy Adzak using a thermo camera, a device that measures heat emissions. The original release came wrapped in a huge colour poster featuring more thermo-shots of the band with the album itself wrapped in a plastic bag. The original music video shot for "Emotional Rescue" also utilised the same type of shots of the band performing. A short time later a second video for "Emotional Rescue" was shot, directed by David Mallett (produced by Paul Flattery & Simon Fields) as well as one for "She's So Cold."

Release and reception

Released in June with the disco-infused hit title track as the lead single, Emotional Rescue was an immediate smash. The title track hit No. 3 on the Billboard Hot 100. The album gave the Rolling Stones their first UK No. 1 album since 1973's Goats Head Soup and spent seven weeks atop the US charts. The follow-up single "She's So Cold" was a top 30 hit while "Dance Pt. 1" reached No. 9 on Billboards Dance chart.

Critical reception was relatively muted, with most reviewers considering the album somewhat formulaic and unambitious, particularly in contrast to its predecessor. Writing in Rolling Stone, Ariel Swartley stated that "as far as the music goes, 'familiar' is an understatement. There's hardly a melody here that you haven't heard from the Stones before". The Village Voice critic Robert Christgau summarized it as "an ordinary Stones album" in an essay accompanying the annual Pazz & Jop critics poll of 1980's best albums, in which Emotional Rescue finished 20th, a result which he deemed "so far out of the money" for "the world's greatest rock and roll band".

Retrospective assessments have been somewhat kinder, with several critics praising the band's performance, despite the sometimes lightweight material. Stephen Thomas Erlewine of AllMusic states that the album "may consist mainly of filler, but it's expertly written and performed filler". In Christgau's Record Guide: The '80s (1990), Christgau said that, while not "great", the album boasts a "mid-'60s [lyrical] charm" in "such tossed-off tropes as 'Where the Boys Go' and 'She's So Cold'", alongside a musical style "looser" than other less-than-great Stones records like It's Only Rock 'n Roll (1974): "[The music is] far more allusive and irregular and knowing: for better and worse its drive isn't so monolithic, and the bass comes front and center like Bill was James Jamerson."

In 1994, Emotional Rescue was remastered and reissued by Virgin Records, and again in 2009 by Universal Music. In 2011, it was released by Universal Music Enterprises in a Japanese-only SHM-SACD version. The 1994 remaster was initially released in a Collector's Edition CD, which replicated many elements of the original album packaging, including the colour poster.

Track listing

Personnel
The Rolling Stones
Mick Jagger – lead vocals , electric guitar , backing vocals , electric piano , percussion 
Keith Richards – electric guitar , backing vocals , acoustic guitar , bass guitar , piano , lead vocals 
Bill Wyman – bass guitar , string synthesizer 
Charlie Watts – drums 
Ronnie Wood – electric guitar , bass guitar , pedal steel , backing vocals , saxophone 

Additional personnel
Ian Stewart – piano  
Nicky Hopkins – synthesizers , piano 
Sugar Blue – harmonica 
Bobby Keys – saxophone 
Michael Shrieve – percussion 
Max Romeo – backing vocals on "Dance (Pt. 1)"
Jack Nitzsche – horn arrangement on "Indian Girl"

Technical
Chris Kimsey – associate producer and engineer
Snake Reynolds – assistant engineer
Sean Fullan – assistant engineer
Ted Jensen – mastering engineer

Charts

Weekly charts

Year-end charts

Certifications

References

External links

1980 albums
Albums produced by the Glimmer Twins
Atlantic Records albums
Rolling Stones Records albums
The Rolling Stones albums
Virgin Records albums
Albums with cover art by Peter Corriston